L.A.R.S. (sometimes stylized as Lars, a backronym of Last American Rock Stars. Originally known as The Davidians) is an American horrorcore duo, formed in Detroit, Michigan. It consists of rappers Bizarre (of D12) and King Gordy (of the Fat Killahz). They are currently signed by Twiztid to Majik Ninja Entertainment.

Formation
In 2003, D12 rapper Bizarre provided guest appearance on King Gordy's debut album The Entity on the track "Time to Die". In 2005, Gordy sung the hook on Bizarre's debut solo album Hannicap Circus on the song "Ghetto Music". In 2007, Gordy appeared on 6 songs of Bizarre's Blue Cheese & Coney Island, and Bizzy appeared on Gordy's Van Dyke and Harper Music and Cobain's Diary. In 2008, they formed a hip hop duo called The Davidians. The Davidians appeared on Esham's mixtape The Butcher Shop and Gordy's The Great American Weed Smoker, seeking a record label to sign them. The duo continued appearing on each other's projects and also was featured on Prozak's Tales from the Sick (2008), Snowgoons' Snowgoons Dynasty (2012), Fury's One of 12 (2016).

In 2017, the duo changed their name to L.A.R.S. (Last American Rock Stars) and got signed a contract with Twiztid's independent record label Majik Ninja Entertainment. They released their debut mixtape Foul World on October 30, 2017 and appeared on Twiztid Presents: Year of the Sword. They dropped their self-titled debut studio album Last American Rock Stars on February 16, 2018, which debuted at number 6 on the US Billboard Heatseekers Albums.

Discography

Studio albums
2018 - Last American Rock Stars

Mixtapes
2017 - Foul World

Guest appearances

Music videos

References

External links

Hip hop duos
Horrorcore groups
Majik Ninja Entertainment artists
Detroit hip hop groups
2008 establishments in Michigan